Acraea oscari is a butterfly in the family Nymphalidae. It is found in Ethiopia.

Description

A. oscari Rothsch. (60 d). Wings above dull red with black marginal band of uniform breadth, on the fore wing 5 mm. and enclosing large yellowish marginal spots, on the hind wing only 3 mm. and indistinctly spotted; forewing broad and rounded, above but little black at the base; hindwing above deep black at the base as far as vein 2 and then whitish to the apex of the cell; the black spots of both wings very large and  arranged quite as in chilo  wings beneath almost as above, but the hindwing broadly whitish in the middle. In the female the ground-colour is brownish white. Abyssinia.

Taxonomy
See Pierre & Bernaud, 2014

References

External links

Images representing  Acraea oscari at Bold

Butterflies described in 1902
oscari
Endemic fauna of Ethiopia
Butterflies of Africa